Apples and Snakes, based at the Albany Theatre in Deptford, south-east London, is an organisation for performance poetry and the spoken word in England.  It has been described as the main organisation promoting performance poetry in Britain. Set up in 1982 by a group of poets, the organisation has been "the development ground for many high profile poets and spoken word artists" and others, including John Agard, Jean "Binta" Breeze, Malika Booker, Billy Bragg, Charlie Dark, Inua Ellams, Phill Jupitus, Lemn Sissay, Kae Tempest, Mike Myers, Toby Jones and many more.

Run by a board of trustees chaired by Kerry Featherstone, Apples and Snakes has been a registered charity since 1986. It currently receives over £400,000 funding annually, as a national portfolio organisation, from Arts Council England.

History
Apples and Snakes was launched in 1982, with its first poetry performance, at the Adam's Arms pub in Conway Street in central London. It is currently one of the organisations resident at the Free Word Centre.

In 2001 it organised a performance poetry event on London Buses. In 2013 it organised a series of events for young poets on climate change. In conjunction with the National Portrait Gallery and the National Literacy Trust, it organised a series of poetry events designed to complement Picture the Poet, a photographic exhibition that was displayed at the National Portrait Gallery and, in autumn 2014, at Sheffield's Graves Art Gallery.

Publications
Paul Beasley (editor). The Popular Front of Contemporary Poetry: Anthology, Apples and Snakes, 1992. Published to celebrate Apples and Snakes' 10th anniversary.

In 1993, Black Spring Press published Velocity: The Best of Apples & Snakes, an anthology of works by contemporary poets who had performed for Apples and Snakes.

Notes and references

External links
 Official website
 Interview with Russell Thompson, a coordinator for Apples and Snakes

Charities based in London
Poetry organizations
Spoken word
1982 establishments in England